Apicalia chuni is a species of sea snail, a marine gastropod mollusk in the family Eulimidae. This taxon is however currently a species inquirenda, (a species of doubtful identity that needs further investigation) and so its status may change over time.

References

 Warén A. (2011). Checklist of Eulimidae. pers. com.

External links
 To World Register of Marine Species

Eulimidae
Gastropods described in 1925